Nuphar microphylla, the small yellow pond lily, is a plant found in North America. It is listed as a special concern and believed extirpated in Connecticut.

References

Flora of North America
Nymphaeaceae